Jimmy Roe (December 27, 1908 in St. Louis, Missouri – August 8, 1999 in St. Charles, Missouri) was a U.S. soccer inside left who spent his entire career in the St. Louis leagues.  He was called into the national team in 1937, but suffered a career ending knee injury before his first game with the team.  He was inducted into the National Soccer Hall of Fame in 1997.

Youth
Roe began playing organized soccer with his school, team St. Matthew School which was among the best teams in the St. Louis Catholic Youth Council.  He attended Christian Brothers College High School where he also played soccer and is a member of the CBC Alumni Hall of Fame.

Professional
In 1928, he joined Marres, a semi-professional team in the St. Louis Municipal (MUNY) League. The MUNY was the city’s de facto second division, sitting below the professional St. Louis Soccer League (SLSL).  At some point, he moved to St. Matthew’s.  In 1929, Row began the season with Russell Florists, but, according to the National Soccer Hall of Fame, he moved to Stix, Baer and Fuller F.C. (SBF) of the SLSL during the season.  This is not possible as SBF was not established until 1931.  In 1932, SBF went to the National Challenge Cup final where it lost to the New Bedford Whalers.  The next year, Roe and his team mates ran off a string of National Cup victories, taking the 1933 and 1934 titles.  Following the 1933 win, SBF played Toronto Scottish for the one time  North American Soccer Championship, which Scottish won 2-1.  In 1934, St. Louis Central Breweries took over sponsorship of the team, renaming the it.  This did not stop Roe and his team mates from winning the 1935 National Cup.  Central Breweries dropped its sponsorship in 1935 and the team competed as the independent St. Louis Shamrocks.  The Shamrocks went to the 1936 and 1937 National Cup finals, but finished runner up in both.

National team
In September 1937, Roe was called into the U.S. national team for a three game series with Mexico.  However, he suffered a career-ending injury before playing a minute.

Roe was inducted into the St. Louis Soccer Hall of Fame and the National Soccer Hall of Fame in 1997.

References

External links
 National Soccer Hall of Fame profile

1908 births
1999 deaths
Soccer players from St. Louis
American soccer players
St. Louis Soccer League players
Stix, Baer and Fuller F.C. players
St. Louis Central Breweries players
St. Louis Shamrocks players
National Soccer Hall of Fame members
Association football forwards